William Allison Forster (1879 – 28 October 1962) was an English professional footballer, who played for Sheffield United, Crystal Palace and Grimsby Town.

Career
Forster played professionally for Sheffield United, before signing for Crystal Palace in 1906. Forster played for Palace in the club's shock defeat of Newcastle in the first round of the 1906–07 FA Cup. Forster left Palace for Grimsby Town in 1908.

References

1870s births
English footballers
Sheffield United F.C. players
Crystal Palace F.C. players
Grimsby Town F.C. players
English Football League players
Southern Football League players
Year of death missing
Association footballers not categorized by position